Haji Muhammad Adeel (10 August 1941 – 18 November 2016) was a Pakistani senator and senior vice president of the Awami National Party.

Biography

A Hindko speaker, was from a family of anti-imperialists, the son of Hakeem Abdul Jalil (Hakeem Sahib was actively involved in the non violence movement, Khudai Khidmatgar against the British Empire in the subcontinent and was the president of All India National Congress Committee Peshawar District and a close colleague of Bacha Khan and Mahatama Gandhi and  Member of Central working committee of Congress.

During his political career he served as finance minister and deputy speaker in the provincial government of Khyber-Pakhtunkhwa. He was the senator and represented Khyber Pakhtunkhwa in the National Finance Commission of Pakistan.

Role in Senate
Committee(s) :
Haji Adeel was member of following standing committees,
Standing Committee on Interior,
Standing Committee on Defence and Defence Production,
Standing Committee on Textile Industry,
Standing Committee on Information and Broadcasting and
Functional Committee on Problems of Less Developed Areas.

His senate tenure started in March 2009 and concluded in March 2015.

Role in national politics
He was Parliamentary Leader in Senate of Pakistan President, Awami National Party (ANP) Pakistan,
Chairman Election Commission of ANP and
Coordinator ANP Lawyers.
He was also Member Central & Provincial Executive Committees of ANP,
Member, National Executive Committee, Pakistan India People Forum for Peace and Democracy and
Member of National Steering Committee INSA (Imagine a New South Asia).

Civil society activist
Haji Adeel was a believer of Pakistan and India friendship. He was very active in campaign and led the caucus of parliamentarians for New South Asia. In 2010, Haji Muhammad Adeel declared Hindu Raja Dahir as the hero of the Pashtuns over Muhammad bin Qasim (Arab general).

Haji Adeel also supported various initiatives for Sustainable Development in Pakistan. He supported Pakistani civil society organizations and South Asian Rights groups.

Death
Haji Muhammad Adeel died of renal failure at Combined Military Hospital Peshawar on 18 November 2016.

References

External links 
Senate of Pakistan 
Sustainable Development Policy Institute
Haji Adeel's Profile on Pakistan Herald

Awami National Party politicians
2016 deaths
Pakistani environmentalists
People from Peshawar
Members of the Senate of Pakistan
Hindkowan people
1944 births
Edwardes College alumni